Sheffield and Rotherham Wildlife Trust is a wildlife trust covering Sheffield and Rotherham, South Yorkshire, England. It has 15 reserves with its base in Sheffield.

Reserves
The trust manages fifteen reserves:

Agden Bog
Blacka Moor
Carbrook Ravine
Carr House Meadows
Centenary Riverside
Crabtree Ponds
Fox Hagg
Greno Woods
Hammond's Field
Kilnhurst Ings
Moss Valley Woodlands
Salmon Pastures
Sunnybank
Woodhouse Washlands
Wyming Brook
Blackburn Meadows was managed by the Trust, but is no longer listed in 2020. In 2019 the Trust reported, 'Blackburn Meadows is owned by Sheffield City Council and not in the Trust’s control. We are working the Council to find a long-term solution to managing this site.'

References

Wildlife Trusts of England